Mamie is a Canadian short animated film, directed by Janice Nadeau and released in 2016. The film narrates the story of a young girl who remembers her grandmother in Gaspésie, but feels that the older woman is indifferent and unaffectionate toward her.

The film was a Canadian Screen Award nominee for Best Animated Short Film at the 5th Canadian Screen Awards, and a Prix Iris nominee for Best Animated Short film at the 19th Quebec Cinema Awards.

References

External links
 Mamie at the National Film Board of Canada
 

2016 films
2010s animated short films
National Film Board of Canada animated short films
Quebec films
French-language Canadian films
2010s Canadian films